Lim Swee Say (born 13 July 1954) is a Singaporean former politician who served as Secretary-General of the National Trades Union Congress between 2005 and 2015, Minister for Manpower between 2015 and 2018, Minister in the Prime Minister's Office between 2004 and 2015, Second Minister for National Development between 2004 and 2005, and Minister for the Environment between 2000 and 2004. 

A member of the governing People's Action Party (PAP), he was the Member of Parliament (MP) representing the Buona Vista ward of Tanjong Pagar GRC between 1997 and 2001, Holland–Bukit Panjang GRC between 2001 and 2006, Holland–Bukit Timah GRC between 2006 and 2011, and the Bedok ward of East Coast GRC between 2011 and 2020.

Lim was appointed as a non-executive independent director in Singtel in 2021.

Early career
Lim served as chief executive of the National Computer Board between 1986 and 1991, and later as chairman between 1994 and 1998. 

He also served as deputy managing director at the Economic Development Board (EDB) based in New York City between 1991 and 1993, and later as managing director between 1994 and 1996.

Political career 
Lim made his political debut in the 1997 general election as part of a five-member PAP team contesting in Tanjong Pagar GRC, led by Prime Minister Lee Kuan Yew and was elected in a walkover. He was on the PAP's team in Holland–Bukit Panjang GRC at the 2001 general election, and in Holland–Bukit Timah GRC at the 2006 general election, and was elected unopposed on both occasions. At the 2011 general election, Lim stood in East Coast GRC, where the PAP's team defeated the team from the opposition Workers' Party by 59,992 votes (54.8%) to 49,429 (45.2%).

Lim served as Deputy Secretary-General of the National Trades Union Congress (NTUC) from 1997 to 1999. He also served on the Committee on Singapore's Competitiveness from 1997 to 1998, and chaired its Sub-committee on Manpower Development.

In 1999, Lim was appointed as Minister of State for Trade and Industry and Minister of State for Information, Communications and the Arts.

Lim was made a member of the PAP's Central Executive Committee in 1999 and served as the chairman of the party's youth wing between 2000 and 2004.

Lim was made the Acting Minister for the Environment on 1 October 2000. He became a full minister of the Cabinet on 23 November 2001.

Minister in Prime Minister's Office (2004–2015)
On 12 August 2004, Lim was appointed a Minister in the Prime Minister's Office. He also served as the Second Minister for National Development from 12 August 2004 to 29 May 2006.

In 2005, Lim became the Deputy Secretary-General of the NTUC for the second time (while continuing to serve concurrently as a Minister without portfolio in the Prime Minister's Office). In 2007, he was made the Secretary-General of the NTUC.

In 2014, Lim appeared on Singapore's Mediacorp Channel 8 episode "Hear Me Out", to respond to the criticisms against him and clarify himself on a few topics such as his Zorro costume, "Cheaper Better Faster", "Better, Betterer, Betterest", "Deaf Frog" and why Singapore implements Progressive Wage Model instead of minimum wage.

Minister for Manpower (2015–2018)
On 4 May 2015, Lim relinquished his post of Minister in Prime Minister's Office and NTUC secretary-general (in line with the NTUC's retirement policies) and was appointed the Minister for Manpower.

Lim retired from the cabinet on 1 May 2018, with his Manpower portfolio succeeded to Josephine Teo. On 5 May, Lim was awarded the Distinguished Comrade of Labour during the May Day Awards ceremony.

Retirement from politics 
In 2020, Lim announced that he would be retiring from politics, and not stand for the 2020 general election.

Education
Lim attended Catholic High School and National Junior College before graduating from Loughborough University in 1976 with a first class honours degree in electronics, computer and systems engineering under a scholarship conferred by the Singapore Armed Forces (SAF) in 1973.

He subsequently went on to complete a master's degree in management at Stanford University in 1991.

Personal life
Lim married to Elaine Cheong Siew Boon in 1981, introduced by a mutual friend. The couple had one daughter and one son. Cheong died on 6 July 2021, after battling stage 4 cancer since 2017.

He is a Roman Catholic.

References

External links
 Lim Swee Say at cabinet.gov.sg
 Lim Swee Say at parliament.gov.sg

Members of the Cabinet of Singapore
Members of the Parliament of Singapore
People's Action Party politicians
Stanford University alumni
National Junior College alumni
Catholic High School, Singapore alumni
Alumni of Loughborough University
Singaporean people of Teochew descent
1954 births
Living people
Environment ministers of Singapore
Singaporean trade unionists
Ministers for Manpower of Singapore